Newey and Eyre was an electrical wholesaling company based in the United Kingdom. Founded in 1926, the company is now part of Rexel.

History 
Established in 1926, Newey & Eyre has celebrated over 80 years of service to the electrical wholesale market. Over the years the business has been acquired by a number of different holding company but has remained relatively unchanged by the corporate mergers.

In 1993 Investor Group Hagemeyer acquired Newey & Eyre Group Ltd from Invensys PLC and in 2008 Newey and Eyre was acquired by Rexel.

In 2009 Newey and Eyre launched an online store, Neweys Online.

Newey & Eyre operates in the UK through a national network of nearly 130 branches with a profiled stock range of more than 32,000 different lines. Another 140,000 products are available either from stock or to special order. Newey and Eyre also hold a range of over 3.500 own branded products called Newlec.

Newey and Eyre's head office is based in Birmingham, West Midlands at Eagle Court.

In 2008 Newey & Eyre opened the capital's first dedicated facilities management centre.

In 2016 Newey & Eyre rebranded to Rexel as part of the One Rexel transformation programme.

References 

Guardian

External links
 Rexel UK, Parent Company

Companies based in Birmingham, West Midlands